The 2017 Ulster Senior Hurling Championship was the 69th staging of the Ulster hurling championship since its establishment by the Ulster Council in 1901.

The tournament was moved to April, instead of the usual June/July dates, in order to accommodate the various tiers of the All-Ireland championship. Antrim won a sixteenth consecutive title.

Format 

The two-tier format introduced in 2016 continued.

Ulster Senior Hurling Championship

In the first tier, the Ulster Senior Hurling Championship, Antrim, Armagh, Donegal and Down compete in a knock-out format. The winners receive the Liam Harvey cup. The two teams beaten in the semi-finals of the Championship play-off with the losing team relegated to the Shield for 2018.

Ulster Senior Hurling Shield

In the second tier, the Ulster Senior Hurling Shield, Derry, Fermanagh, Monaghan and Tyrone compete in a knock-out format, with the winner gaining promotion to the top tier for 2018. Cavan do not participate.

Promotion/Relegation

The Shield winners are promoted to the top tier and the loser of the top tier relegation play-off are relegated.

All-Ireland Senior Hurling Championship

There is no direct path for the Ulster Champions in the 2017 All-Ireland Senior Hurling Championship. The Counties competed in the Christy Ring Cup, Nicky Rackard Cup and Lory Meagher Cup.

Teams

Championship Teams

Shield Teams

Ulster Senior Hurling Championship

Bracket

Ulster Championship Semi-Finals

Ulster Final

Relegation Match 

 Donegal withdrew ahead of the match, and were relegated to the 2018 Ulster Hurling Shield. Down retained their place for the 2018 Ulster Hurling Championship.

Ulster Senior Hurling Shield

Bracket

Ulster Shield Semi-Finals

Ulster Shield Final 

 Derry won the 2017 Ulster Hurling shield and promotion to the 2018 Ulster Senior Hurling Championship.

References 

Ulster
Hurling
Ulster Senior Hurling Championship